The ethnic groups of Africa number in the thousands, with each population generally having its own language (or dialect of a language) and culture. The ethnolinguistic groups include various Afroasiatic, Khoisan, Niger-Congo, and Nilo-Saharan populations.

The official population count of the various ethnic groups in Africa is highly uncertain, both due to limited infrastructure to perform censuses and due to the rapid population growth. There have also been accusations of deliberate misreporting in order to give selected ethnicities numerical superiority (as in the case of Nigeria's Hausa, Fulani, Yoruba, and Igbo peoples).

A 2009 genetic clustering study, which genotyped 1327 polymorphic markers in various African populations, identified six ancestral clusters. The clustering corresponded closely with ethnicity, culture and language. A 2018 whole genome sequencing study of the world's populations observed similar clusters among the populations in Africa. At K=9, distinct ancestral components defined the Afroasiatic-speaking populations inhabiting North Africa and Northeast Africa; the Nilo-Saharan-speaking populations in Northeast Africa and East Africa; the Ari populations in Northeast Africa; the Niger-Congo-speaking populations in West-Central Africa, West Africa, East Africa and Southern Africa; the Pygmy populations in Central Africa; and the Khoisan populations in Southern Africa.

Lists

By linguistic phylum

As a first overview, the following table lists major groups by ethno-linguistic affiliation, with rough population estimates (as of 2016):

Major ethnic groups
The following is a table of major ethnic groups (10 million people or more):

See also

References

Ethnic groups
 
Africa

de:Liste afrikanischer Sprachen